National Pro Fastpitch held two drafts before the 2016 season:

First, the 2016 NPF Expansion Draft was held for the expansion Scrap Yard Dawgs to acquire players for their inaugural roster from existing  NPF teams.

With the arrival of the expansion Dallas Charge, NPF created a process for expansion teams to acquire talent: choosing either one player via a 'Market Choice Selection' (a college player either who is from the expansion team's state or who played for a college in the expansion team's state)  or five players from an Expansion Draft.  The Dawgs opted for the expansion draft.

Secondly, the 2016 NPF College Draft was the 13th annual collegiate draft for NPF.

Expansion Draft
On November 30, 2015, it was announced that the  following players were selected by the Scrap Yard Dawgs in the 2015 NPF Expansion Draft: (Only Koerner and Washington actually played for the Dawgs; Low and Freeman retired before the season, and Garcia was released.)

College Draft
The 2016 NPF College Draft was the 13th annual collegiate draft for NPF, and was held on Thursday, April 14, 2016, 7:00 pm CST at the CMA Theater in the Country Music Hall of Fame and Museum in Nashville, Tennessee. Draft order was determined by regular season standings from 2015, but subsequent trades and transactions altered the overall draft order.  The draft was broadcast live on CBS Sports Network.  The first selection was catcher Lexie Elkins from Louisiana–Lafayette, picked by the Pennsylvania Rebellion.

Drafting an athlete gives an NPF affiliate team the rights to that athlete for two full seasons.

Draft Selections 
NPF announced the draft order 
With the addition of the Scrap Yard Dawgs, a league expansion team for the 2016 season, the added four additional bonus selections for the Dawgs. 

Following are the 40 selections from the 2016 NPF draft:

Position key: 
C = catcher; INF = infielder; SS = shortstop; OF = outfielder; UT = Utility infielder; P = pitcher; RHP = right-handed pitcher; LHP = left-handed pitcher
Positions will be listed as combined for those who can play multiple positions.

Round 1

Round 2

Round 3

Round 4

Round 5

Round 6

Draft notes

Round 1:

Round 2:

Round 3:

Round 4:

Round 5:

Round 6:

References 

National Pro Fastpitch drafts
Softball in the United States
Softball teams
2016 in softball